Rhizostomatidae is a family of cnidarians in the class Scyphozoa.

Genera and species
According to the World Register of Marine Species,  11 extant species are in four extant genera within this family:
Genus Eupilema
Eupilema inexpectata Pages, Gili & Bouillon, 1992
Genus Nemopilema
Nemopilema nomurai Kishinouye, 1922
Genus Rhizostoma Cuvier, 1800
Rhizostoma luteum (Quoy & Gaimard, 1827)
Rhizostoma octopus (Linnaeus, 1758)
Rhizostoma pulmo (Macri, 1778)
Genus Rhopilema Haeckel, 1880
Rhopilema esculentum Kishinouye, 1891
Rhopilema hispidum
Rhopilema nomadica
Rhopilema rhopalophora (Haeckel)
Rhopilema rhopalophorum Haeckel, 1880
Rhopilema verrilli

Extinct taxa

 Genus †Essexella
 Genus †Simplicibrachia, is known from fossils in the Ypresian-aged Monte Bolca lagerstatten.

References

 
Daktyliophorae
Cnidarian families